The Deschutes Public Library administrative building, located at 507 N.W. Wall Street in Bend, Oregon, is listed on the National Register of Historic Places. The architect was Whitehouse & Church of Portland.

The building now serves as an administrative headquarters for the Deschutes Public Library System.

See also
 National Register of Historic Places listings in Deschutes County, Oregon

References

External links

1939 establishments in Oregon
Culture of Bend, Oregon
Former library buildings in the United States
Libraries on the National Register of Historic Places in Oregon
Library buildings completed in 1939
National Register of Historic Places in Bend, Oregon